Eupithecia otiosa is a moth in the family Geometridae. It is found in Tibet.

References

Moths described in 1981
otiosa
Moths of Asia